The Skyrunning World Championships are skyrunning competitions held for the first time in 2010 and organised by the International Skyrunning Federation. The second edition was held in 2014 and thereafter the championships have taken place on a biennial basis.

Editions

Medals

Men's Vertical Kilometer

Women's Vertical Kilometer

Men's SkyMarathon

Women's SkyMarathon

Men's Ultra SkyMarathon

Women's Ultra SkyMarathon

See also
Skyrunner World Series

References

External links
 International Skyrunning Federation official web site

 
World Championships
Skyrunning
Recurring sporting events established in 2010